EBSCO Industries is an American company founded in 1944 by Elton Bryson Stephens Sr. and headquartered in Birmingham, Alabama. The EBSCO acronym is based on Elton Bryson Stephens Company. EBSCO Industries is a diverse company of over 40 businesses engaged in activities including information services (EBSCO Information Services), outdoor products, manufacturing, general services, publishing services, and real estate.

EBSCO is one of the largest privately held companies in Alabama, and one of the top 200 in the U.S., based on revenues and employee numbers, according to Forbes Magazine.

History 
EBSCO was co-founded by Elton Bryson Stephens Sr. and his wife Alys Robinson Stephens in 1944 to sell magazine subscriptions, personalized binders and magazine racks to the U.S. Armed Forces. They named this "Military Service Company", and over the next decade acquired several other companies that were eventually combined to form EBSCO Industries Inc.

In 2011, EBSCO Publishing took over H. W. Wilson Company.

References

External links
 
 EBSCO Industries at Funding Universe

 
Companies based in Birmingham, Alabama
Privately held companies based in Alabama
Conglomerate companies established in 1944
Stephens family
Fishing equipment manufacturers
1944 establishments in Alabama